Zweifel is a German surname. Notable people with the surname include:

Albert Zweifel (born 1949), former professional cyclo-cross cyclist
Clint Zweifel (born 1973), American politician from Missouri
David E. Zweifel (born 1934), American Ambassador to North Yemen 
Paul Zweifel (1848–1927), German gynaecologist and physiologist
Richard G. Zweifel (born 1926), American herpetologist
 Zweifel's frog (Rana zweifeli)

German-language surnames